Cedric Teuchert (born 14 January 1997) is a German professional footballer who plays as a forward for 2. Bundesliga club Hannover 96.

Club career
Teuchert made his 2. Bundesliga debut with 1. FC Nürnberg in 2014 as a 17-year-old. In the first half of the 2017–18 season he scored six goals and made two assists in 15 league matches. In his time at the club, he made a total of 45 appearances, scoring 11 goals and assisting 6 times.

On 3 January 2018, it was announced that Teuchert had joined Bundesliga club FC Schalke 04 from 1. FC Nürnberg for a reported €1 million transfer fee, agreeing a -year contract.

Teuchert joined Union Berlin on 1 August 2020.

On 2 January 2022, Teuchert returned to Hannover 96 and signed a contract until 30 June 2024.

International career
Teuchert is a youth international for Germany. In October 2017, he made his debut for the U21 side.

Career statistics

References

External links

1997 births
Living people
Footballers from Bavaria
People from Coburg
Sportspeople from Upper Franconia
German footballers
Germany youth international footballers
Germany under-21 international footballers
Olympic footballers of Germany
Association football forwards
1. FC Nürnberg players
1. FC Nürnberg II players
FC Schalke 04 players
Hannover 96 players
1. FC Union Berlin players
Bundesliga players
2. Bundesliga players
Regionalliga players
Footballers at the 2020 Summer Olympics